Colden Auditorium is 2,085-seat concert hall located on the campus of Queens College in Flushing, Queens, New York City. The auditorium is named after Charles S. Colden, founder of Queens College. It was built in 1961 and designed by the architectural firm Fellheimer & Wagner.

References

Concert halls in New York City
Entertainment venues in Queens, New York
Music venues completed in 1961